St Germans Rural District was a local government division of Cornwall in England, UK, between 1894 and 1974. Established under the Local Government Act 1894, the rural district was enlarged in 1934 by the abolition of Callington Urban District and Calstock Rural District, as well as undergoing a few boundary changes with other adjacent districts.

In 1974 the district was abolished under the Local Government Act 1972, forming part of the new Caradon district.

Civil parishes
The civil parishes within the district were:

 Antony
 Botusfleming
 Callington
 Calstock
 Deviock
 Landrake with St Erney
 Landulph
 Maker with Rame
 Millbrook
 Pillaton
 Quethiock
 Sheviock
 St Dominick
 St Germans
 St John
 St Mellion

References

Districts of England created by the Local Government Act 1894
Districts of England abolished by the Local Government Act 1972
Rural districts of England
Local government in Cornwall
History of Cornwall